Kampong Bukit Beruang is a village in Tutong District, Brunei, about  from the district town Pekan Tutong. The population was 6,157 in 2016. It is one of the villages within Mukim Telisai, a mukim subdivision in the district. It comprises the original village settlement as well as the public housing estate Bukit Beruang National Housing Scheme.

Public housing 

It is one of the only two public housing estates in the district; the other one is STKRJ Kampong Telisai.

The housing estate began construction in 2010 and was contracted to Tee international from Singapore. It was planned to complete 1,500 houses by 2013.

Facilities 
The local primary schools include:
The current building began to be used in 1999. As of 2004, it had 33 teachers for the morning session and 11 in the afternoon, as well as 364 pupils from preschool to Primary 6. The school facilities include classrooms, library, dental clinic, playground and canteen.
 Perpindahan Kampong Bukit Beruang II Primary School
Each school also shares grounds with a  i.e. school for the country's Islamic religious primary education.

Rancangan Perumahan Negara Bukit Beruang Mosque is the village mosque.

Other facilities located in the village include:
 Tutong Sixth Form Centre, the only sixth form college in the district
 Sayyidina 'Othman Secondary School, the government secondary school for the residents of Mukim Telisai
 , the village community hall
 Bukit Beruang Fire Station, opened in 2014 and one of the only three fire stations in the district.

References 

Villages in Tutong District
Public housing estates in Brunei